Nikolas Nicolaou (born May 10, 1979 in Nicosia) is a retired Cypriot football defender, who played for Olympiakos Nicosia. He was the captain of Olympiakos Nicosia and also assistant manager of the club in 2014. He took over as coach of the U21 team in the 2016-2017 season when he retired from the first team. On 24 July 2016 he also took over as caretaker manager of the first team of Olympiakos Nicosia until 12 August 2016, following the mutually agreed termination with Chrysis Michael.

For the year 2013-2014, he was voted as one of the best defenders in the Cypriot Second Division B1.

References

External links
 

1979 births
Living people
Cypriot footballers
Association football defenders
Alki Larnaca FC players
Doxa Katokopias FC players
Olympiakos Nicosia players
Digenis Akritas Morphou FC players
Cypriot First Division players
Cypriot Second Division players